Joshua Daniel Gorges (born August 14, 1984) is a Canadian former professional ice hockey defenseman. He is of German ancestry; his grandparents immigrated from Germany to Canada. Gorges played in the National Hockey League (NHL) for the San Jose Sharks, Montreal Canadiens and Buffalo Sabres.

Playing career
As a youth, Gorges played in the 1998 Quebec International Pee-Wee Hockey Tournament with a minor ice hockey team from Kelowna.

Gorges played major junior for his hometown Kelowna Rockets of the Western Hockey League (WHL) from 2000 through 2004. After going undrafted in 2002, he signed as a free agent with the San Jose Sharks. Gorges was named Team WHL captain for the 2003 RE/MAX Canada-Russia Challenge. He was also a member of Team Canada at the 2004 World Junior Ice Hockey Championships, where he won a silver medal. In 2004, the Rockets (with Gorges as team captain) won the Memorial Cup. 

During the 2004–05 NHL lockout, Gorges played for the Sharks' American Hockey League (AHL) affiliate, the Cleveland Barons. He made his debut for the Sharks during the 2005-06 season, skating in 49 games.

On February 25, 2007, Gorges and a 2007 first-round pick were traded to the Montreal Canadiens in exchange for Craig Rivet and a 2008 fifth-round pick. On July 9, 2008, the Canadiens signed Gorges to a three-year, $3.3 million contract extension.

On February 10, 2010, during a game against the Washington Capitals, Gorges was hit on the left side of the head by a slap shot from Mike Green. Gorges remained motionless on the ice for several minutes, with his head bleeding. He eventually was helped up by team doctors and helped to the bench. The Canadiens eventually won the game 6–5 in OT to end the Capitals 14-game win streak. Gorges skated in practice the next day and was quoted as saying "Unless something happens in the next 24 hours, I’ll be in the lineup against the Flyers."

Gorges was widely praised for his performances in the 2010 Stanley Cup Playoffs, with Don Cherry declaring "Josh Gorges should be captain of the Canadiens, there’s no doubt in my mind. He’s a captain’s captain. This isn’t in any way to say that Brian Gionta is bad, it’s only to say that Gorges is so good. He’s exceptional. And I think Brian would be happy to have a little pressure taken off him so he could just play the game. Look up the word ‘leader’ in the dictionary, and you’ll find Gorges’s picture."

On July 22, 2011, the Canadiens re-signed Gorges to a one-year, $2.5 million contract extension.

On January 1, 2012, Gorges signed a six-year, $23.4 million contract extension with the Canadiens.

On July 1, 2014, Gorges was traded to the Buffalo Sabres in exchange for a 2016 second-round pick. He refused to waive his no-trade clause to be traded to the Canadiens' rival, the Toronto Maple Leafs.

Upon concluding his contract with the Sabres following the 2017–18 season, Gorges remained an un-signed free agent over the summer and into the 2018–19 season. On January 14, 2019, Gorges announced his retirement from his 13 season NHL career.

Post-hockey Career

Gorges served as the West Kelowna Warriors Director of Player Development. He has helped organize a local mental health charity baseball game in Kelowna with other former NHLers.

Career statistics

Regular season and playoffs

International

Awards
2002–03: WHL – West Second All-Star Team
2004: Memorial Cup – George Parsons Trophy (Most Sportsmanlike Player)
2003–04: WHL – West First All-Star Team
2004: Junior World Championships – Silver medal
2004–05: Cleveland Barons rookie of the year
2004–05: Cleveland Barons Rubbermaid "Player of the Year" (along with Doug Murray)
2011–12: Montreal Canadiens Jacques-Beauchamp-Molson individual team award (Unsung Hero)

References

External links

1984 births
Buffalo Sabres players
Canadian ice hockey defencemen
Canadian people of German descent
Cleveland Barons (2001–2006) players
Ice hockey people from British Columbia
Sportspeople from Kelowna
Kelowna Rockets players
Living people
Montreal Canadiens players
San Jose Sharks players
Undrafted National Hockey League players
Worcester Sharks players